Liu Ping-hua (born 6 October 1955) is a Taiwanese politician who served on the Legislative Yuan from 1993 to 1996, as a member of the Kuomintang representing Taipei County. His elder brother Liu Ping-wei has also served on the Legislative Yuan.

References

1955 births
Living people
Members of the 2nd Legislative Yuan
New Taipei Members of the Legislative Yuan
Kuomintang Members of the Legislative Yuan in Taiwan